This article presents a detailed timeline of events in the history of computing software and hardware: from prehistory until 1949. For narratives explaining the overall developments, see History of computing.

Prehistory–antiquity

Medieval–1640

1641–1850

1851–1930

1931–1940

1941–1949

Computing timeline
Timeline of computing
1950–1979
1980–1989
1990–1999
2000–2009
2010–2019
2020–present
History of computing hardware

Notes

References

External links
 A Brief History of Computing, by Stephen White. An excellent computer history site; the present article is a modified version of his timeline, used with permission.
 The Evolution of the Modern Computer (1934 to 1950): An Open Source Graphical History, article from Virtual Travelog
 Timeline: exponential speedup since first automatic calculator in 1623 by Jürgen Schmidhuber, from "The New AI: General & Sound & Relevant for Physics, In B. Goertzel and C. Pennachin, eds.: Artificial General Intelligence, pp. 175–198, 2006."
 Computing History Timeline,  a photographic gallery on computing history
 Computer History by Computer Hope
 Timeline of Computer History by Computer History Museum

1949
History of computing hardware